St Oswald's Vicarage is an historic building in the English village of Warton, Lancashire. Largely built in 1823 (although its rear wing dates to around 1300), it was formerly the clergy house for the nearby St Oswald's Church. It is now a Grade I listed building. It is constructed in coursed limestone. A post-war extension of the property is not of special interest.

See also
Grade I listed buildings in Lancashire

References

1823 establishments in England
Clergy houses in England
Grade I listed buildings in Lancashire